The Barbados Tramway Company operated a network of horse-drawn narrow gauge trams in Bridgetown, capital of Barbados, with an unknown gauge of approximately 1,067 mm (3 feet 6 inch).

History 
In 1882 a horse-drawn tramway, the Barbados Tramway Company, was constructed in Bridgetown by the Scottish railway engineer Robert Fairlie.

Robert Fairlie obtained permission to construct and operate a street railway in Bridgetown, and registered Barbados Tramway Company on 5 December 1882. The Barbados Tramway Company opened the first 2 miles (3.2 km) of its St. Lawrence tram line, as far as Hastings Rocks, on 5 December 1885.
The main hub was near Nelson's Column at Trafalgar Square.

The tram network consisted of five lines, ending in Fontabelle, Belfield, Hindsbury, Belleville and St. Lawrence. The network had up to 10 miles (16 km) of track. The Barbados Tramway Company operated up to 25 horse-drawn tramcars. Instead of numbers the trams had names, such as ACTIVE, ALERT and JUBILEE.

Gasoline-powered buses began to attract more and more passengers with effect of 1907. There were several bus companies by 1908 competing against the slower trams. Thus the tramway was sold in 1910 to U.S. investors and renamed to Bridgetown Tramway Company. The American investors initially wanted to build extensions north to Speightstown and south to Oistins Town, but their plans did not get realized. Instead, the tramway ceased to operate in 1925.

See also
Barbados Railway
St. Nicholas Abbey Heritage Railway
Rail transport in Barbados

References

External links

Rail transport in Barbados
Bridgetown
3 ft 6 in gauge railways in Barbados
Defunct town tramway systems by city
Horse-drawn railways